Cherokee Supreme Court Building (also known as Cherokee County School) is museum at Keetoowah Street and Water Avenue in Tahlequah, Oklahoma. The building was constructed in 1844 and it was added the National Register of Historic Places in 1974. It is the oldest government building in Oklahoma and possibly the oldest building still surviving in the state.

The building that once housed the Supreme Court of the Cherokee Nation has been converted into a museum, the Cherokee National Supreme Court Museum and is open to the public. It reportedly is the oldest public building in Oklahoma.  It was constructed on the southeast corner of the town square by James S. Pierce in 1844. The first chief justice of the Cherokee Nation, John Martin (judge) (1784–1840) held court here. The printing press for the early-day Cherokee Phoenix newspaper was also located in this building, and a reproduction of the press and the newsroom can be seen here.

See also
Oldest buildings in Oklahoma

Notes

References

		
National Register of Historic Places in Cherokee County, Oklahoma
Buildings and structures completed in 1844